Rock Candy Funk Party Takes New York: Live at the Iridium is the live album by American jazz and funk group Rock Candy Funk Party. It was released on February 25, 2014 through J&R Adventures.

Track listing 
All tracks written by Tal Bergman / Joe Bonamassa / Ron DeJesus / Michael Merritt / Renato Neto unless indicated

Charts

References

2014 live albums
Rock Candy Funk Party albums